Oakley is a historic plantation and home located in Spotsylvania County, Virginia, Virginia. The Federal/Georgian style, -story home was built in 1828 by Samuel Alsop, Jr. as a wedding present for his daughter, Clementina. Alsop built several notable houses in Spotsylvania County including Kenmore, Spotswood Inn, and Fairview.

Oakley was part of a grant of  given to Gawain Corbin by the King of England.  Alsop bought  in 1816. The Georgian home was built using bricks made in two kilns that Alsop built on the property.

Oakley is located near the site of many major battles of the American Civil War. A number of battles and skirmishes occurred on or near the property. According to a letter written by a resident of the house at the time, during one two-day period, the house was ransacked by "...at least 2000 soldiers tramping through the house." A Yankee soldier disobeyed his Major's orders to burn the house down.

During the latter half of the 19th century, the house was neglected and used more as a barn than a home. In 1919, the property was purchased by a Mr. McHenry who wanted to mine for silver and gold. The mining project failed and, in 1926, the plantation was sold to George C. Beals. The property has been owned by the Beals since then. Running water and electricity were added in the 1940s and central heating in the 1960s.

Oakley was added to the National Register of Historic Places in May 2002.

References

Plantations in Virginia
Houses on the National Register of Historic Places in Virginia
Federal architecture in Virginia
Houses completed in 1828
Houses in Spotsylvania County, Virginia
Georgian architecture in Virginia
National Register of Historic Places in Spotsylvania County, Virginia